Troy Graves (born May 4, 1972) is an American serial rapist and murderer of Shannon Schieber. He committed a series of rapes in Philadelphia between 1997 and 1999, where he was known as the "Center City rapist". He also committed rapes in Fort Collins, Colorado, in 2001, where he was arrested in 2002. He is serving a life sentence in the Sterling Correctional Facility in Sterling, Colorado.

Early life
Troy was born to Earl and Michal Graves in Minnesota. He grew up in New York and Pennsylvania, living with his mother and older brother, Marc, following his parents' divorce in 1986. He dropped out of Bensalem High School in 1989 and worked various jobs in the Philadelphia area while living in the neighborhoods of West Philadelphia and Center City.

His whereabouts were unknown throughout July–October 1999, when he reported for basic training at Lackland Air Force Base in Texas. Following training, he was assigned to F.E. Warren Air Force Base in Cheyenne, Wyoming in April 2000, as a maintenance worker on missile silos.

In March 2001, Graves was married in Larimer County, Colorado and the couple later settled into a home a few blocks west of the Colorado State University campus in Fort Collins.

Criminal career

Philadelphia attacks
June 20, 1997: a woman on South 21st Street is the target of an attempted rape by a home intruder;
July 11, 1997: a woman on Pine Street was raped by a home intruder;
August 6, 1997: a woman on Pine Street was raped by a home intruder;
 August 13, 1997: a woman on Pine Street was raped by a home intruder;
 May 7, 1998: Wharton School doctoral student Shannon Schieber was raped and murdered by a home intruder;
 August 28, 1999: a woman on Naudain Street was raped by a home intruder.

Fort Collins attacks
 May 10, 2001: a woman on Raintree Drive was raped;
 June 13, 2001: a woman on Raintree Drive was raped;
 June 24, 2001: a woman on Battlecreek Drive was raped by a home intruder;
 July 26, 2001: a woman on Prospect Road was raped by a home intruder;
 August 5, 2001: a woman on University Avenue was raped by a home intruder;
 August 23, 2001: a woman on Landings Drive was raped by a home intruder; she scared him away as he tried to attack her roommate.

Arrest and trial
On April 23, 2002, Fort Collins police arrested Graves for a series of six rapes near Colorado State University. Graves' DNA matched that of the Center City rapist and that left at Schieber's murder scene, a link made in May 2001 that had led law enforcement in both states to work together to create a list of individuals who had connections in Fort Collins and Philadelphia. Fort Collins authorities also linked Graves to at least one of the Colorado crimes through fingerprint evidence.

Graves pleaded guilty to the Fort Collins assaults on May 17, 2002, and to the Philadelphia crimes on May 30, 2002, in order to prevent a possible death sentence in Philadelphia. He was sentenced to life in prison without possibility of parole in both states, but will serve his time in Colorado because he pleaded guilty there first.

In popular culture
Television shows about the case include:
Dateline NBC, episode "Justice for Shannon", first aired 4 March 2003
Forensic Files, episode "All Charged Up", first aired 10 December 2002 
Cold Case, episode "Our Boy Is Back", first aired 12 October 2003
Cold Blood, episode "Philadelphia's Night Stalker", first aired 17 May 2012
People Magazine Investigates, episode "Terror in Philadelphia", first aired 12 November 2018.

References

External links
Coverage of the Schieber Murder/Center City Rapes from the Philadelphia Inquirer

1972 births
American rapists
American prisoners sentenced to life imprisonment
Prisoners sentenced to life imprisonment by Colorado
Prisoners sentenced to life imprisonment by Pennsylvania
Criminals from Minnesota
American people convicted of murder
People convicted of murder by Colorado
People convicted of murder by Pennsylvania
Living people
Criminals from Philadelphia